Redwood Coast Transit (RCT) provides bus service in Del Norte County, CA. The service offers 4 City Routes that operate in Crescent City, 2 regional routes that provide connections to Gasquet and Arcata, and a school route that provides 1 daily trip from Del Norte High School. RCT also offers a Dial A Ride service which primarily provides ADA Paratransit Service but the general public can pay a surcharge to use the service as well.

Fares 
Current Fares

RTC has two types of fare: Local Fares paid on local routes and Zone Based Fares on Regional Routes. Youth, Seniors and people with a disability can receive a discounted fare.

COVID-19 Response 
In April 2020, evening trips on all lines and weekend service on lines 2 and 4 were discontinued due to reduced demand and staffing levels as a result of the COVID-19 pandemic. On March 23, 2020, RCT eliminated fare collection to promote social distancing between passengers and operators, however this led to a spike in non-essential trips and operator complaints about crowded buses which lead RCT to resume fare collection in early April 2020. Ridership during the pandemic is now down about 50%.

Routes

Local Routes

Regional Routes

School Route

References

Bus transportation in California
Transit agencies in California
Public transportation in Del Norte County, California